Bánh bò (literally "cow cake" or "crawl cake") is a sweet, chewy sponge cake from Vietnam. It is made from rice flour, water, sugar, and yeast, and has a honeycomb-like appearance (called rễ tre, literally "bamboo roots," in Vietnamese) on the inside due to the presence of numerous small air bubbles. Coconut milk is also usually a part of the batter, imparting a slight flavor and aroma of coconut. The cake is of Southern Chinese origin, although the Chinese version, called bái táng gāo (白糖糕), does not contain coconut milk. Bánh bò are generally eaten as a dessert, although they may also be consumed as an accompaniment to a meal.<ref>Andrea Nguyen Into the Vietnamese Kitchen" p291 "bánh bò"</ref>

Etymology
In the Vietnamese language,  means "cake", and  can either mean "cow" or "to crawl". However, according to a popular folk etymology,  refers to how the cake "crawls" up to the rim of the bowl when steamed to completion. is to be distinguished from the less common bánh bó ("pressed cake"), a fruit cake found in Quảng Ngãi Province;  ("cow", "beef") is pronounced with a falling tone, whereas  ("pressed") has a rising tone.

Varieties
There are varieties of bánh bò:
Bánh bò nướng - This variety of bánh bò is cooked by baking in a pan in an oven. It is generally off-white or yellowish-white in color on the inside and golden on the outside by caramelized coconut milk. Individual cakes are often large in size, in which case a serving will consist of a slice rather than the whole cake.photo This variety is definitely served alone.
Bánh bò hấp is similar in appearance to the baked version. These cakes are often small in size, ball-shaped and cooked from the liquid. Bánh bò hấp may be white in color, green (by Pandanus amaryllifolius extract), pink or pale purple (by magenta plant extract). There are three ways to serve this variety. Like bánh bò nướng, it can be used alone. It can be put in the middle of bánh tiêu (Chinese hollow doughnuts) and served. Also, people enjoy them in a small dish with coconut milk sauce including tapioca starch on top and a little bit muối mè or muối đậu phộng (literally: sesame salt and peanut salt, respectively).

Both traditional varieties are available in Vietnam as well as in Asian grocery stores in countries with substantial overseas Vietnamese populations, such as the United States and France.

Bánh bò sữa (nướng) is a brand new variety of bánh bò appearing in the mid-2000s. Coconut milk, the official traditional ingredient is replaced by condensed milk or milk powder. The variety is cooked in a small pan.
Bánh bò dừa is the latest variety of bánh bò appearing in the late 2000s. It is not generally recognized because it seems totally different from three above mainly from core ingredients. Core ingredients are wheat powder, hen eggs, baking soda, and obviously sweetened coconut. It tastes much leathery, seldom hard crispy and silky in the skin as opposed three above. In the middle, there is sweetened coconut with cooked mung bean.

The Indian steamed rice cake called idli is similar in texture, although idli'' are never sweet. However, the dish is quite similar to the Vattayappam (a type of appam from Kerala, India).

See also
White sugar sponge cake
Idli
Bika ambon

Notes and references

External links

Photo of a slice of bánh bò nướng
Bánh bò hấp recipe
Bánh bò hấp recipe
Bánh bò nướng recipe
Bánh bò nướng recipe
Discussion about bánh bò nướng
Photo of green-colored bánh bò nướng
Alice's Guide to Vietnamese Banh

Foods containing coconut
Vietnamese words and phrases
Steamed foods
Rice cakes
Sponge cakes
Bánh
Yeast breads